WTYL-FM (97.7 FM) is a radio station broadcasting a country music format. Licensed to Tylertown, Mississippi, United States.  The station is currently owned by Tylertown Broadcasting Co.

References

External links
 

Country radio stations in the United States
TYL-FM